Irfan Ljubijankić (26 November 1952 – 28 May 1995) was a Bosnian facial surgeon, classical music composer, politician and diplomat. He served as Minister of Foreign Affairs of the Republic of Bosnia and Herzegovina from 30 October 1993 until he was killed in action on 28 May 1995 during the Bosnian War.

Biography
Ljubijankić was born to a Bosnian Muslim family in Bihać, Yugoslavia, the town in which he lived for most of his life. He graduated from the University of Belgrade's School of Medicine and became a medical doctor specializing in ear, nose and throat treatments.

In 1990, as Bosnia was preparing to secede from Yugoslavia, he was elected to the Bosnian parliament and became a leading member of the Bosniak-dominated Party of Democratic Action. He temporarily left politics in 1992 after the beginning of the Bosnian War, in order to serve as a medical doctor in Bihać.

Ljubijankić remained an active medical doctor until October 1993 when he became Minister of Foreign Affairs. He traveled widely to help gain international support for the country. Shortly before his death, he represented Bosnia and Herzegovina at the 50th anniversary celebration of the end of World War II in London on 1 May 1995.

Death
Ljubijankić was killed on 28 May 1995 when his helicopter was shot down by a missile over Cetingrad, a Croatian town near the Bosnian border being held by Serb rebels at that time. He was flying from Bihać to Zagreb on government business. Six other people on the helicopter also died. Ljubijankić was married and had two children.

After Ljubijankić's death, singer Yusuf Islam, a friend, appeared at a 1997 benefit concert in Sarajevo and recorded a benefit album named after a song written by Ljubijankić, "I Have No Cannons That Roar".

References

1952 births
1995 deaths
People from Bihać
Bosniaks of Bosnia and Herzegovina
Bosnia and Herzegovina diplomats
Victims of aviation accidents or incidents in Croatia
Victims of aircraft shootdowns
University of Belgrade Faculty of Medicine alumni
Bosnia and Herzegovina composers
Bosnia and Herzegovina classical musicians
Party of Democratic Action politicians
Foreign ministers of Bosnia and Herzegovina
20th-century classical musicians
20th-century composers